Nahuel Guillermo Amarilla (born 22 May 1996) is an Argentine professional footballer who plays as a centre-back.

Career
Amarilla played the early years of his youth in Ushuaia with Mutual, Los Andes and Educación Fueguina, which preceded a move to Rosario with Academia Griffa. He started his senior career with Ferro Carril Oeste in Primera B Nacional. After being an unused substitute for fixtures across 2015 and 2016 with Atlético Paraná and Almagro, Amarilla made his senior debut on 18 June 2016 during a defeat to Gimnasia y Esgrima. He was on the bench fifteen times in 2016–17, though did appear four times; including for the first time as a starter on 21 June 2017 versus Douglas Haig on home soil.

Amarilla left on 17 July 2018 to Club Sol de Mayo of Torneo Federal A on loan. However, the deal was terminated a month later as Amarilla agreed a loan to Primera B Metropolitana's Colegiales. He spent the 2018–19 campaign with the club, though made just two competitive appearances. Amarilla terminated his Ferro contract on 20 February 2020, as he subsequently joined San Martín de Formosa. He appeared in Torneo Federal A against Sportivo Las Parejas and Atlético Güemes in March, before the league's curtailment due to the COVID-19 pandemic.

Career statistics
.

References

External links

1996 births
Living people
People from Ushuaia
Argentine footballers
Association football defenders
Primera Nacional players
Primera B Metropolitana players
Torneo Federal A players
Ferro Carril Oeste footballers
Club Atlético Colegiales (Argentina) players
Gimnasia y Esgrima de Concepción del Uruguay footballers
Juventud Unida de Gualeguaychú players